The 2019–20 Al Ahly season was the 112th season in the football club's history and 61st consecutive and overall season in the top flight of Egyptian football, the Egyptian Premier League. In addition to the domestic league, Al Ahly also participated in this season's editions of the domestic cup, the Egypt Cup, the Egyptian Super Cup, and the first-tier African cup, the CAF Champions League. The season covers a period from 1 July 2019 to 5 December 2020.

Kit information
Supplier: Umbro
Sponsors: WE, SAIB Bank, GLC Paints, Tiger Chips, Royal Dutch Shell

Players

Current squad

Youth Academy

Out on loan

Transfers

Transfers in

Loans in

Transfers out

Loans out

Friendly matches

Competitions

Overview

Egyptian Premier League

League table

Results summary

Results by round

Matches
The fixtures for the 2019–20 season were announced on 12 September 2019.

Egypt Cup

Al Ahly entered the competition from the round of 32 and were given a home tie against Egyptian Second Division side Beni Suef. The bracket of the tournament was also decided at the time of the round of 32 draw; meaning that the path to the final for each time was decided prior to playing any matches. Also, all matches are played on stadiums selected by the Egyptian Football Association starting from the round of 16.

Egyptian Super Cup

As the winners of the 2018–19 Egyptian Premier League, Al Ahly faced 2018–19 Egypt Cup winners Zamalek in the Egyptian Super Cup. The match was played on 20 February 2020 in the United Arab Emirates.

CAF Champions League

Al Ahly entered the competition for the 22nd consecutive time after winning the league in the previous season. Al Ahly were ranked 4th in the CAF 5-Year Ranking prior to the start of the 2019–20. As a result, they entered the competition from the preliminary round since only the top 3 ranked teams were given a bye to the first round.

Preliminary round 

The draw for the preliminary round was held on 21 July 2019. Al Ahly were drawn against Atlabara from South Sudan.

First round 

The draw for the first round was held on 21 July 2019 (after the preliminary round draw). Al Ahly were drawn against the winner of the tie involving Cano Sport from Equatorial Guinea and Mekelle 70 Enderta from Ethiopia, which was won by the former.

Group stage

The draw for the group stage was held on 9 October 2019. Al Ahly were drawn in Group B alongside Étoile du Sahel from Tunisia, Al Hilal from Sudan and FC Platinum from Zimbabwe.

Quarter-finals

The draw for the quarter-finals was held on 5 February 2020. Al Ahly were drawn against Mamelodi Sundowns from South Africa.

Semi-finals

Final

</onlyinclude>

Statistics

Appearances and goals

! colspan="13" style="background:#DCDCDC; text-align:center" | Players transferred out during the season
|-

|}

Goalscorers

Clean sheets

Notes

References

Al Ahly SC seasons
Egyptian football clubs 2019–20 season
2019–20 CAF Champions League participants seasons